Splendrillia bratcherae is a species of sea snail, a marine gastropod mollusk in the family Drilliidae.

Description
The length of the shell attains 12.3 mm, its diameter 4.1 mm.

Distribution
This marine species occurs from the Sea of Cortez, Western Mexico to Panama.

References

  Tucker, J.K. 2004 Catalog of recent and fossil turrids (Mollusca: Gastropoda). Zootaxa 682:1–1295.
  McLean & Poorman, 1971. New species of Tropical Eastern Pacific Turridae; The Veliger, 14, 89–113

External links
 

bratcherae
Gastropods described in 1971